Drvanja is a settlement in the Slovene Hills in the Municipality of Benedikt in northeastern Slovenia. The area is part of the traditional region of Styria. It is now included in the Drava Statistical Region.

A small chapel-shrine in the settlement dates to 1910.

Traces of a Roman-period settlement and a burial ground have been identified near the settlement.

References

External links
Drvanja at Geopedia

Populated places in the Municipality of Benedikt